Claudia Delgadillo González (born 24 July 1972) is a Mexican politician affiliated with MORENA. She currently serves as a regidora (city councilor) in Guadalajara, Jalisco, having previously been a federal deputy in the LXII Legislature of the Mexican Congress (with the PRI).

In November 2018, she temporarily left her post in Guadalajara to assist the new MORENA federal government in coordinating federal aid programs, particularly conducting a census of program recipients in Guadalajara. She returned to the city council two months later.

References

1972 births
Living people
Women members of the Chamber of Deputies (Mexico)
Members of the Chamber of Deputies (Mexico)
Morena (political party) politicians
21st-century Mexican politicians
21st-century Mexican women politicians
Deputies of the LXII Legislature of Mexico